The National Technological Institute of Mexico (in , TNM) is a Mexican public university system created on 23 July 2014 by presidential decree. At the time of its foundation, the Institute incorporated the 263 former Institutes of Technology that had been created since 1948; first under the patronage of the National Polytechnic Institute (IPN) and, since 1959, directly dependent of the Secretariat of Public Education (SEP).

Campuses
The Institute has 264 campuses across Mexico including:

Notes and references

External links

Public universities and colleges in Mexico
Educational institutions established in 2014
2014 establishments in Mexico